Coundon railway station was a railway station that served the villages of Coundon and New Coundon in County Durham, North East England from 1885 to 1939.

History 
The station opened in 1885 as a stop on a new single-track line built by the North Eastern Railway linking  to Burnhouse Junction, where it joined the earlier Byers Green Branch built by the Clarence Railway (a predecessor of the NER) in 1837. In 1925 the station was served by eight trains to Ferryhill and seven to Bishop Auckland. The station closed completely in May 1948 though freight continued to pass through its site until September 1956.

The trackbed of the railway through Coundon has been converted into the Auckland Walk, a path for walkers and cyclists.

References

External links 

Disused railway stations in County Durham
Former North Eastern Railway (UK) stations
Railway stations in Great Britain opened in 1885
Railway stations in Great Britain closed in 1939